A slur is a symbol in Western musical notation indicating that the notes it embraces are to be played without separation (that is, with legato articulation). A slur is denoted with a curved line generally placed over the notes if the stems point downward, and under them if the stems point upwards.

Performance 

Slurs mean different things for different instruments:

For bowed string instruments, the notes should be played in one bow stroke.
 For plucked string instruments, such as guitars, the notes should be played without plucking the individual strings (hammer-ons and pull-offs).
 For wind instruments, the notes should be played without re-articulating each note (tonguing), except for the slide trombone (and other instruments that control the pitch with a slide), on which only certain kinds of combinations can be played with no tongue without making a glissando – thus "legato tonguing" is employed.
 For vocal music, slurs are usually used to mark notes which are sung to a single syllable (melisma).

A slur can be extended over many notes, sometimes encompassing several bars. In extreme cases, composers are known to write slurs which are near-impossible to achieve; in that case the composer wishes to emphasise that the notes should be performed with as much legato as possible.

See also
Tie (music), a similar symbol but for connecting lengths of notes together
Musical phrasing

References

Articulations (music)
Musical notation

es:Legato